Adamy is a rural locality (an aul) in Krasnogvardeyskoye Rural Settlement of Krasnogvardeysky District, Adygea, Russia. The population was 1340 as of 2018. There are 28 streets.

Geography 
The aul is located on the shore of the Krasnodar Reservoir of the Kuban River, near the mouth of the Belaya River, 12 km southwest of Krasnogvardeyskoye (the district's administrative centre) by road. Chumakov is the nearest rural locality.

Ethnicity 
The aul is inhabited by Adighes.

References 

Rural localities in Krasnogvardeysky District